Suburbs are a residential area or a mixed use area, either existing as part of a city or urban area or as a separate residential community within commuting distance of a city.

Suburbs, Suburb or The Suburbs may also refer to:

 The Suburbs, a 2010 album by Arcade Fire
 "The Suburbs" (song), a 2010 song by Arcade Fire
The Suburbs (band), an American rock band
 The Suburbs EP, a 1978 extended play by The Suburbs
 Suburbs (album), a 1986 album by The Suburbs
 Suburb (film), a 1951 Argentine drama film

See also
 Suburban (disambiguation)
 Suburbia (disambiguation)